The 1960 Taça de Portugal Final was the final match of the 1959–60 Taça de Portugal, the 20th season of the Taça de Portugal, the premier Portuguese football cup competition organized by the Portuguese Football Federation (FPF). The match was played on 3 July 1960 at the Estádio Nacional in Oeiras, and opposed two Primeira Liga sides: Belenenses and Sporting CP. Belenenses defeated Sporting CP 2–1 to claim the Taça de Portugal for a second time.

Match

Details

References

1960
Taca
Sporting CP matches
C.F. Os Belenenses matches